Parliamentary elections were held in Mongolia on 26 June 1966. At the time, the country was a one-party state under the rule of the Mongolian People's Revolutionary Party. The MPRP won 234 of the 287 seats, with the remaining 53 seats going to non-party candidates, who had been chosen by the MPRP due to their social status. Voter turnout was reported to be 100%, with only 14 registered voters failing to cast a ballot.

Results

References

Mongolia
1966 in Mongolia
Elections in Mongolia
One-party elections
Election and referendum articles with incomplete results